Obie Walker (September 19, 1911 - May 23, 1989), born Obie Dia Walker in Cochran, Georgia, was a professional boxer. Walker was the penultimate World Colored Heavyweight Champion from 9 October 1933, when he out-decisioned title holder George Godfrey in a 10-round fight at the Arena in Philadelphia, Pennsylvania, to 20 July 1935, when he lost the title on a decision in a 15-round bout to former colored heavyweight champ Larry Gains on 20 July 1935 in Tigers Rugby Stadium, Leicester, England.

A heavyweight contender of the 1930s, he was avoided by many boxers. Sportswriter Ed Danforth praised the "Bearcat" in the Atlanta Georgian in a column published on 5 July 1938:

"Walker became the toast of Paris. He knocked cold every topnotcher he met on the continent. Max Schmeling shrewdly dodged him, the best of the Englishmen too, sidestepped the squatty brown man who carried lighting bolts in both fists. Competent critics say he could have knocked out Schmeling, Joe Louis and Jim Braddock in one night within the space of 10 rounds." 

Though short, Walker was quick on his feet, could take a punch on the chin, and was a strong puncher. Among the top heavyweight contenders he defeated was Two-Ton Tony Galento, who fought Joe Louis for the heavyweight championship. It was Louis's long reign as champ that ended the World Colored Heavyweight Title.

In his career, Walker won 77 fights (53 by K.O.) and lost 16, with 5 draws. He was never K.O.'ed himself.

Legacy and honors

In 2020 award-winning author Mark Allen Baker published the first comprehensive account of The World Colored Heavyweight Championship, 1876-1937, with McFarland & Company, a leading independent publisher of academic & nonfiction books. This history traces the advent and demise of the Championship, the stories of the talented professional athletes who won it, and the demarcation of the color line both in and out of the ring.

For decades the World Colored Heavyweight Championship was a useful tool to combat racial oppression-the existence of the title a leverage mechanism, or tool, used as a technique to counter a social element, “drawing the color line.”

Professional boxing record
All information in this section is derived from BoxRec, unless otherwise stated.

Official record

All newspaper decisions are officially regarded as “no decision” bouts and are not counted in the win/loss/draw column.

Unofficial record

Record with the inclusion of newspaper decisions in the win/loss/draw column.

References

1911 births
1989 deaths
Boxers from Georgia (U.S. state)
Heavyweight boxers
African-American boxers
World colored heavyweight boxing champions
American male boxers
20th-century African-American sportspeople